Patriarch Meletius II may refer to:

 Meletius II of Constantinople, Ecumenical Patriarch in 1768–1769
 Patriarch Meletius II of Alexandria, ruled in 1926–1935